Oregon is an unincorporated community in Baltimore County, in the U.S. state of Maryland.

History
A post office called Oregon was established in 1879, and remained in operation until 1902. The community was named after the state of Oregon.

References

Unincorporated communities in Baltimore County, Maryland
Unincorporated communities in Maryland